The canton of Les Pieux is an administrative division of the Manche department, northwestern France. Its borders were modified at the French canton reorganisation which came into effect in March 2015. Its seat is in Les Pieux.

It consists of the following communes:

Barneville-Carteret
Baubigny
Benoîtville
Bricquebosq
Fierville-les-Mines
Flamanville
Grosville
La Haye-d'Ectot
Héauville
Helleville
Le Mesnil
Les Moitiers-d'Allonne
Pierreville
Les Pieux
Port-Bail-sur-Mer
Le Rozel
Saint-Christophe-du-Foc
Saint-Georges-de-la-Rivière
Saint-Germain-le-Gaillard
Saint-Jean-de-la-Rivière
Saint-Maurice-en-Cotentin
Saint-Pierre-d'Arthéglise
Sénoville
Siouville-Hague
Sortosville-en-Beaumont
Sotteville
Surtainville
Tréauville

References

Cantons of Manche